Brad Lackey (born July 8, 1953) is an American former professional motocross racer. He competed in the   AMA Motocross Championships from 1970 to 1972 and, in the Motocross World Championships from 1973 to 1982. Lackey was notable for becoming the first and only American to win the 500cc motocross world championship, in 1982. Nicknamed "Bad Brad", Lackey was inducted into the Motorcycle Hall of Fame in 1999 and, in 2013 he was inducted into the Motorsports Hall of Fame of America.

Early career
Born in Berkeley, California, Lackey was the son of an avid motorcyclist. He grew up riding off-road motorcycles in the mountains around the San Francisco Bay area. He began racing motocross at the age of 13 and had progressed to become an expert-ranked rider by the early 1970s. In 1970, he received sponsorship from a local CZ dealer. At that time, the sport of motocross was beginning to grow in popularity in the United States and, American motocross racers were not as advanced as the racers from Europe where the sport had originated. From watching European motocross racers, Lackey learned about the importance that physical fitness played in being a successful racer.

In 1971, CZ sent Lackey to Czechoslovakia to enter a training camp to develop his physical fitness and riding abilities. While training in Czechoslovakia, he lived in a room with no heating or running water but, he was driven on by his determination to compete against the best motocross racers in the world. While he was in Czechoslovakia, Lackey gained his first experience on the world championship motocross Grand Prix circuit when CZ entered him into a few 250cc Grand Prix races.

He returned to the United States and competed in the 1971 AMA 500cc motocross national championship, finishing in second place just one point behind champion Mark Blackwell. Lackey began the 1972 AMA Motocross National Championship season winning 4 of the first 7 races on a CZ, at which point the Kawasaki factory offered Lackey a contract to race for them. He won his fifth race of the season on a Kawasaki and clinched the 1972 AMA 500cc 1972 AMA Motocross National Championship in dominating fashion. He also finished as the highest ranked American rider in the 1972 Trans-AMA motocross series. At the end of the 1972 season, Lackey, along with Jim Pomeroy, Jimmy Weinert and Gary Jones were selected by the AMA to be the first-ever team to represent the United States at the Motocross des Nations where the team posted a seventh place result.

World championship career
Kawasaki wanted Lackey to continue racing in the United States however, he was determined to go to Europe to race against the best riders in the world in the world championship Grand Prix events. In 1973, Lackey set out on what would eventually be a ten-year quest for a 500cc Motocross World Championship, which at the time was the most prestigious class in motocross competition. Lackey along with Jim Pomeroy, Jimmy Weinert and Tony DiStefano represented the United States at the 1974 Motocross des Nations event where they finished in an impressive second-place, marking the best-ever result at the time for an American team at the event. On July 3, 1977, Lackey became the first American rider to score an overall victory in a 500cc motocross world championship Grand Prix when he won the British Grand Prix.

Over the years, he rode for several different factories including, Kawasaki, Husqvarna, Honda and Suzuki, finishing as high as second in the world in 1978 and 1980. He often encountered bad luck with bike failures at inopportune times, prompting the European motorcycling press to dub him "Bad Luckey". In the 1980 season, Lackey went into the final race of the season trailing the championship points leader, André Malherbe by a single point however, he crashed in the final race to eliminate his hopes for a world championship. Despite the setbacks, Lackey persevered and in 1982, after a ten-year effort, he was able to clinch his first and only 500cc Motocross World Championship aboard a Suzuki. After his triumph, Suzuki scaled back their racing efforts and Lackey was left without a sponsor. He decided to retire on top, as world champion.

Lackey was inducted into the Motorcycle Hall of Fame in 1999 and, in 2013 he was inducted into the Motorsports Hall of Fame of America. Today, Lackey continues his involvement in the sport of motocross taking part in vintage motocross racing.

Motocross Grand Prix Results

Motocross championships
 1972 A.M.A. 500cc Motocross National Champion
 1982 F.I.M. 500cc Motocross World Champion
 2000 Over 40 AHRMA Champion

References

External links
 Brad Lackey Home page
 Hanging Out With The Champ - What's Up With Brad Lackey?

Living people
1953 births
Sportspeople from Berkeley, California
People from Lafayette, California
People from Pinole, California
American motocross riders
AMA Motocross Championship National Champions